SACS may refer to:
 SACS, a finite element analysis software by Bentley Systems
 SACS (gene), a human gene that encodes the protein Sacsin
 The South Atlantic Cable System, a transoceanic submarine communications cable
 Saint Alphonsus Catholic School, a Catholic School found at Lapu-Lapu City, Cebu, Philippines
 St Andrew's Cathedral School, an Anglican school in Sydney, Australia
 The South African College Schools, a school in Cape Town, South Africa
 The Southern Association of Colleges and Schools, an educational accreditation body in the southern United States
 Success Academy Charter Schools
 Suzuki Advanced Cooling System, used in some Suzuki motorcycle engines

See also
 Sacs, an alternate name for the Sauk, a native American people